Corduroy is a woven fabric.

Corduroy may also refer to:
"Corduroy" (song), a 1994 song by Pearl Jam
"Corduroy", a 1990 song by The Wedding Present from the 3 Songs EP and the album Seamonsters
Corduroy (band), a London-based acid jazz band
Corduroy (TV series), a PBS animated television show
Corduroy (book), a children's book by Don Freeman
Corduroy road, or log road, a type of road 
Snow grooming, manipulated snow pattern known as corduroy